Mohan Lal may refer to:

 Mohanlal (born 1960), Indian actor, producer and playback singer
 Mohan Lal Kashmiri (1812–1877), traveller, diplomat, and author